Susan Walsh (born 1962), also known by her married name Susan Stankavage, is an American former competition swimmer who won two medals at the 1982 World Aquatics Championships. She qualified for the 1980 Summer Olympics in the 100-meter backstroke, but could not compete because of their United States-led boycott of the Soviet-hosted games.  She was 0.01 seconds short of qualifying for the 1984 Olympics in the same event.

Biography
Walsh was born in Hamburg, New York, as the youngest of five children and started swimming because of her father Bob, a swimming official. She graduated from the Mount Mercy Academy and then from the University of North Carolina (1984), with a degree in business administration and accounting. In 1987 she became assistant swimming coach and in February 1989 started working at the Educational Foundation, better known as the Rams Club.

In 2003, she was inducted to the North Carolina Sports Hall of Fame. In the 2000s, she was still competing in swimming in the masters category. In 2007, she set six world records in the 45–49 age group at the 2007 United States Master's Swimming Championships.

Family
She was married to Scott Stankavage, a former American football quarterback, from 1986 to 1997.  They had three children: Sarah and Shelby are swimmers, and Shawn plays football.

See also
 List of World Aquatics Championships medalists in swimming (women)

References

1962 births
Living people
American female backstroke swimmers
North Carolina Tar Heels women's swimmers
People from Hamburg, New York
Swimmers at the 1983 Pan American Games
World Aquatics Championships medalists in swimming
Pan American Games gold medalists for the United States
Pan American Games silver medalists for the United States
Pan American Games medalists in swimming
Universiade medalists in swimming
Universiade silver medalists for the United States
Universiade bronze medalists for the United States
Medalists at the 1981 Summer Universiade
Medalists at the 1983 Summer Universiade
Medalists at the 1983 Pan American Games